Adventure was a wooden sloop that was built in 1834 at Brisbane Water. She was wrecked on the coast of New South Wales during a storm in July 1836, but the exact position where she was lost is uncertain.

References

Further reading
Online Database's
Australian National Shipwreck Database
Australian Shipping - Arrivals and Departures 1788-1968 including shipwrecks 
Encyclopedia of Australian Shipwrecks - New South Wales Shipwrecks 

Books
Wrecks on the New South Wales Coast. By Loney, J. K. (Jack Kenneth), 1925–1995 Oceans Enterprises. 1993 .
Australian Shipwrecks - vol1 1622-1850, Charles Bateson, AH and AW Reed, Sydney, 1972, Call number 910.4530994 BAT

Shipwrecks of New South Wales
Ships built in New South Wales
1834 ships
Maritime incidents in July 1836
1788–1850 ships of Australia
Merchant ships of Australia
Sloops of Australia